Paravilla aridula is a species of bee flies (insects in the family Bombyliidae).

References

aridula
Articles created by Qbugbot
Insects described in 1981